Eagle Grove High School is a rural public high school located in Eagle Grove, Iowa.  It is part of the Eagle Grove Community School District.

Overview
The school district is the largest district in Wright county and draws students from the towns of Eagle Grove, Thor, Vincent, Woolstock, and surrounding areas in Iowa.

The mascot of Eagle Grove High School (EGHS) is the eagle, and school colors are purple and gold. The school song is set to the tune of the Notre Dame Victory March. 

Notable clubs at this school include Future Business Leaders of America (FBLA), Spanish Club, Fellowship of Christian Athletes (FCA), Future Farmers of America (FFA), National Honor Society (NHS), Student Council, and others.

Athletics
The Eagles participate in the Top of Iowa Conference in the following sports:
Football
Cross Country
 Boys' 2-time Class 2A State Champions (1984, 1987)
Volleyball
Basketball
Wrestling
 Boys' 3-time State Champions (1974, 1986, 1987)
Track and Field
Baseball
 2002 Class 2A State Champions 
Softball

See also
List of high schools in Iowa

References

External links
School Review

Public high schools in Iowa
Schools in Wright County, Iowa
1880s establishments in Iowa